Dumitru "Mitică" Dragomir (born May 30, 1946) is a former president of the Romanian Professional Football League from 1996 until 2014. Before that, he served as the president of Chimia Râmnicu Vâlcea, Olt Scorniceşti, FCM Braşov, and Victoria București.

He also sat in the Romanian Chamber of Deputies from 2000 to 2008, representing Vâlcea County and winning election twice, more specifically in 2000 and in 2004. He was a member of the Greater Romania Party (PRM) for most of that period, but resigned from the party in September 2008 and sat as an independent MP for the remainder of his second term.

On 23 June 2016, Dragomir was sentenced to 7 years' imprisonment for tax evasion, embezzlement, and money laundering. The sentence was not final. He was acquitted of all charges by the Bucharest Court of Appeals in November 2018, the decision being final.

See also

 List of corruption scandals in Romania

Notes

References
 Dumitru Dragomir, reales preşedinte al LPF
 Dumitru Dragomir, trimis în judecată pentru corupţie
 Mihai Ionescu, Mircea Tudoran, Fotbal de la A la Z, Editura Sport-Turism, Bucharest, 1984, p. 295

Living people
1946 births
People from Bălcești
Romanian footballers
Members of the Chamber of Deputies (Romania)
Greater Romania Party politicians
Romanian football chairmen and investors
Association footballers not categorized by position
Romanian sports executives and administrators